Olaf of Mann and the Isles or Olaf of the Isle of Man may refer to:

 Olaf I of Mann (c. 1080–1153)
 Olaf II of Mann (1173/4–1237)